Martha Southgate (born December 12, 1960) is an African-American novelist and essayist best known for her novel Third Girl from the Left.  Her work has appeared in The New York Times Magazine, O, Premiere, and Essence.

Early life
Southgate was born in Cleveland, Ohio. She attended Smith College before obtaining an MFA in creative writing from Goddard.

Writing career
Southgate's first novel Another Way to Dance, about a 14-year-old black aspiring ballerina, was published in 1997 by Delacorte Press. For that work she won the Coretta Scott King John Steptoe Award for New Talent.

In 2002 she released The Fall of Rome: A Novel, set in a New England private boys boarding school.

Her third novel, Third Girl from the Left, was published in 2005.

Southgate's most recent novel, The Taste of Salt was published in 2011 by Algonquin Books.

Adaptations
In 2013 plans for an adaptation of Southgate's novel Third Girl from the Left were announced. Actresses Kerry Washington and Viola Davis were attached to star.

Works
 Another Way to Dance (1997)
 The Fall of Rome: A Novel (2002)
Third Girl from the Left (2005)
The Taste of Salt (2011)

References

External links
 

1960 births
20th-century American novelists
African-American novelists
Goddard College alumni
Smith College alumni
Writers from Cleveland
American women novelists
20th-century American women writers
Living people
Novelists from Ohio
20th-century African-American women writers
20th-century African-American writers
21st-century African-American people
21st-century African-American women